Cobb Peak can refer to two mountains in the United States:
Cobb Peak (Idaho) in Blaine County
Cobb Peak (Utah) in Tooele County, Utah